Lipoma HMGIC fusion partner-like 5 is a protein that in humans is encoded by the LHFPL5 gene.

Function

This gene is a member of the lipoma HMGIC fusion partner (LHFP) gene family, which is a subset of the superfamily of tetraspan transmembrane protein encoding genes. Mutations in this gene result in deafness in humans, and a mutation in a similar gene in mice results in deafness and vestibular dysfunction with severe degeneration of the organ of Corti. It is proposed to function in hair bundle morphogenesis.

References

Further reading